The 2019 UEFA European Under-17 Championship (also known as UEFA Under-17 Euro 2019) was the 18th edition of the UEFA European Under-17 Championship (37th edition if the Under-16 era is also included), the annual international youth football championship organised by UEFA for the men's under-17 national teams of Europe. The Republic of Ireland, which was selected by UEFA on 9 December 2016, hosted the tournament.

A total of 16 teams played in the tournament, with players born on or after 1 January 2002 eligible to participate. Starting from this season, up to five substitutions were permitted per team in each match. Moreover, each match has a regular duration of 90 minutes, instead of 80 minutes in previous seasons.

Same as previous editions held in odd-numbered years, the tournament acted as the UEFA qualifiers for the FIFA U-17 World Cup. The top five teams of the tournament qualified for the 2019 FIFA U-17 World Cup in Brazil as the UEFA representatives.

In the final, defending champions Netherlands defeated Italy 4–2 to win their fourth title.

Qualification

All 55 UEFA nations entered the competition, and with the hosts Republic of Ireland qualifying automatically, the other 54 teams competed in the qualifying competition to determine the remaining 15 spots in the final tournament. The qualifying competition consisted of two rounds: Qualifying round, which took place in autumn 2018, and Elite round, which took place in spring 2019.

Qualified teams
The following teams qualified for the final tournament.

Note: All appearance statistics include only U-17 era (since 2002).

Notes

Final draw
The final draw was held on 4 April 2019, 18:30 IST (UTC+1), at the Aviva Stadium in Dublin, Republic of Ireland. The 16 teams were drawn into four groups of four teams. The hosts Republic of Ireland were assigned to position A1 in the draw, while the other teams were seeded according to their results in the qualification elite round. The seven best elite round group winners (counting all elite round results) were placed in Pot 1 and drawn to positions 1 and 2 in the groups, and the remaining eight teams (the eighth-best elite round group winner and the seven elite round group runners-up) were placed in Pot 2 and drawn to positions 3 and 4 in the groups.

Venues
The tournament was hosted in seven venues:

Match officials
A total of 8 referees, 12 assistant referees and 4 fourth officials were appointed for the final tournament.

Referees
 Jørgen Daugbjerg Burchardt
 Manfredas Lukjančukas
 Trustin Farrugia Cann
 Espen Eskås
 Krzysztof Jakubik
 Donald Robertson
 Rade Obrenović
 Mykola Balakin

Assistant referees
 Ilir Tartaraj
 Yauheni Ramanau
 Deniz Sokolov
 Jan Hermansen
 Riku Vihreävuori
 Gylfi Mar Sigurdsson
 Fatlum Berisha
 Sergey Vassyutin
 Raimonds Tatriks
 Joaquim Da Silva
 Frantisek Ferenc
 Lewiss Ross Edwards
Fourth officials
 Kaarlo Oskari Hämäläinen
 Petri Viljanen
 Paul McLaughlin
 Iwan Arwel Griffith

Squads

Each national team have to submit a squad of 20 players (Regulations Article 38).

Group stage
The final tournament schedule was announced on 11 April 2019.

The group winners and runners-up advance to the quarter-finals.

Tiebreakers
In the group stage, teams are ranked according to points (3 points for a win, 1 point for a draw, 0 points for a loss), and if tied on points, the following tiebreaking criteria are applied, in the order given, to determine the rankings (Regulations Articles 17.01 and 17.02):
Points in head-to-head matches among tied teams;
Goal difference in head-to-head matches among tied teams;
Goals scored in head-to-head matches among tied teams;
If more than two teams are tied, and after applying all head-to-head criteria above, a subset of teams are still tied, all head-to-head criteria above are reapplied exclusively to this subset of teams;
Goal difference in all group matches;
Goals scored in all group matches;
Penalty shoot-out if only two teams have the same number of points, and they met in the last round of the group and are tied after applying all criteria above (not used if more than two teams have the same number of points, or if their rankings are not relevant for qualification for the next stage);
Disciplinary points (red card = 3 points, yellow card = 1 point, expulsion for two yellow cards in one match = 3 points);
UEFA coefficient for the qualifying round draw;
Drawing of lots.

All times are local, IST (UTC+1).

Group A

Group B

Group C

Group D

Knockout stage
In the knockout stage, penalty shoot-out is used to decide the winner if necessary (no extra time is played).

Bracket

Quarter-finals
Winners qualify for 2019 FIFA U-17 World Cup. The two best losing quarter-finalists enter the FIFA U-17 World Cup play-off.

Ranking of losing quarter-finalists
To determine the two best losing quarter-finalists which enter the FIFA U-17 World Cup play-off, the losing quarter-finalists are ranked by the following criteria (Regulations Article 16.06):
Position in the group stage (i.e., group winners ahead of group runners-up);
Results in the group stage (i.e., points, goal difference, goals scored);
Results in the quarter-finals (i.e., points, goal difference, goals scored);
Disciplinary points in the group stage and quarter-finals combined;
UEFA coefficient for the qualifying round draw;
Drawing of lots.

FIFA U-17 World Cup play-off
Winner qualifies for 2019 FIFA U-17 World Cup.

Semi-finals

Final

Goalscorers

Team of the tournament
The UEFA technical observers selected the following 11 players for the team of the tournament:

Qualified teams for FIFA U-17 World Cup
The following five teams from UEFA qualify for the 2019 FIFA U-17 World Cup.

1 Bold indicates champions for that year. Italic indicates hosts for that year

International broadcasters

Television 
21 of 32 live matches and highlights are available on UEFA.com and UEFA.tv YouTube channel for all territories around the world. 

Note : Live matches on YouTube is not available in Republic of Ireland (host), Germany, Israel, MENA, and USA.

Participating nations

Non-participating European nations

Outside Europe

Radio

Participating nations

Non-participating European nations

References

External links
2019 #U17EURO finals: Republic of Ireland, UEFA.com

 
2019
Under-17 Championship
2019 Uefa European Under-17 Championship
2019 in Republic of Ireland association football
2019 in youth association football
2019 FIFA U-17 World Cup qualification
May 2019 sports events in Europe